The Mysteries of Tangier or Steel Eagles (Spanish:Águilas de acero o los misterios de Tánger) is a 1927 Spanish silent adventure film directed by Florián Rey.

Cast
 Francisco Corrales 'Negro Pancho'
 Pedro Larrañaga 
 Rafael López Rienda
 Ricardo Núñez 
 Elita Panquer
 Ricardo Prieto
 Julio Ruiz de Alda as Aviador  
 Luis Suevos as Aviador

References

Bibliography
  Eva Woods Peiró. White Gypsies: Race and Stardom in Spanish Musical Films. U of Minnesota Press, 2012.

External links

1927 films
Spanish silent films
Films directed by Florián Rey
Spanish black-and-white films
Spanish adventure films
1927 adventure films